Ilyas Kashmiri (25 December 1925 – 12 December 2007) was a Pakistani film actor.

Early life and career
Born in Muhalla Dara Shikoh, near Rivoli Cinema, in Lahore, Punjab, British India, Kashmiri became an actor in Bombay before the Partition of India. Throughout his career, Kashmiri appeared in more than 600 movies.

Ilyas Kashmiri was strongly built, tall and handsome. Due to his long acting career, he remained an inspiration for the beginners in the Pakistani film industry and was known as Taya Jee in the film world.

Filmography
 Mundri (1949) (a Punjabi-language film)
 Mahi Munda (1956)
 Kismet (1956)
 Yakke Wali (1957)
 Waada (1957)
 Mukhra (1958)
 Imam Din Gohavia (1967)
 Mera Ghar Meri Jannat (1968
 Rangeela (1970)
 Khushia (1973)
 Banarsi Thug (1973 film) (1973)
 Ziddi (1973)
 Sharif Badmash (1975)
 Bin Badal Barsaat (1975)
 Wehshi Jatt (1975)
 Aik Gunnah Aur Sahi (1975)
Chitra Tay Shera (1976)
 Ranga Daku (1979)
 General Bakht Khan (1979)
 Behram Daku (1980)
 Sher Khan (1981)
 Chan Varyam (1981)
 Chan Suraj (1981)
 Maidan (1982)
 Ik Doli (1982)
 Rustam Tey Khan (1983)
 Sher Mama (1983)
 Dara Baloch (1983)
 Jagga Tay Shera (1984)
 Kalia (1984)
 Malanga (1986)
 Mela (1986)
 Saranga (1994)
 Madam Rani (1995)

Death
Ilyas Kashmiri died on 12 December 2007 in Lahore, aged 81. He had been bed-ridden for the past 6 years. He had been suffering from diabetes for some years and his left leg was amputated a few years ago due to gangrene. His wife, Parveen, had died 10 years before him.

See also 
 List of Lollywood actors

References

External links
 Filmography of Ilyas Kashmiri on IMDb website

1925 births
2007 deaths
Pakistani male film actors
Pakistani film producers
Pakistani people of Kashmiri descent
Male actors from Lahore